The voters of the U.S. state of Ohio elect a secretary of state for a four-year term.

Notes

References

 

State secretary of state elections in the United States